Haj, nek se čuje, haj, nek se zna (English: Come On, Let It Be Heard, Come On, Let It Be Known) is the first solo studio album by Bosnian rock star Alen Islamović, released in 1989.

Track listing
Haj, nek se čuje, haj, nek se zna
Čin čin čini mi se
Prostakuša
Divlje godine
Moje sele
Trokiram (Ubiću se moje luče)
Ovo zrno duše
Ime
Kad bi mi tebe Bog oprostio

References

1989 albums
Alen Islamović albums